The 5th Wave is a trilogy of young adult post-apocalyptic sci-fi novels written by American author Rick Yancey. The series started in May 2013 with the first book, The 5th Wave. A sequel titled The Infinite Sea was published in 2014. The trilogy concluded in 2016 with the final book, The Last Star.

Overview 
Earth is systematically attacked by a group of aliens known as "the Others". They exist in an unknown form and attack through a series of waves. After the first four waves have decimated the human population, the remaining populace is terrifyingly awaiting the arrival a new Fifth Wave, one that will supposedly wipe the human race clean off the planet. The story follows a group of children as they try to find their way through a world that is slowly reverting to the Stone Age.

Origins 
Yancey stated in an interview with Lightspeed Magazine that the basis for The 5th Wave came from a question he asked his wife about her worst fears. "It was one of those three a.m. conversations where your mind starts going, and I asked her, on the spur of the moment, 'What is your greatest fear?' She said, without hesitation, 'Alien abduction.'" Yancey continued on, telling how he developed the plot for the series. "It was basically trying to think like an alien, and considering the fact that if they are out there, they probably wouldn’t attack without getting to know us very, very well. They would learn how we think, they would learn about what do humans do in times of crisis, and they would turn that to their own advantage. So, when I was working through how the attacks might work, I realized first that it couldn’t just be one attack—the world’s too big—you’d have to do it in stages, or waves." The first book was officially published on May 7, 2013.

Books

The 5th Wave

The 5th Wave is the first book in the series and was released on May 7, 2013.

The book opens in the midst of the Fourth Wave and follows Cassie's quest to find her brother, Sammy, after he is taken by U.S. Army soldiers. Cassie is shot by an Other-affiliated sniper, a "Silencer", from the woods on her trek, and is later rescued by Evan Walker, who nurses her back to health and agrees to help her find her brother. Meanwhile, Sammy arrives at Wright-Patterson AFB, which is now a "training camp" called Camp Haven. It is revealed over the course of the story that the soldiers are recruiting (truly, abducting) children into an army, telling them they are the last hope for fighting back against the Others. Sammy is placed in Squad 53 and befriends squadmate Ben Parish, who is coincidentally Cassie's long-lost crush from high school. After the two set out, Cassie and Evan are attacked by a squad from Wright-Patterson, and, after seeing how easily Evan dispatches them, Cassie finds out that Evan was the Silencer who originally shot her. He then helped her because he had fallen in love and couldn't bring himself to kill her. The two, though uneasily, coordinate a plan to extract Sammy then begin executing it. While deployed, Ben and his squadmate Ringer start to piece together their true purposes and learn that Wright-Patterson is actually run by the Others. It is revealed that the Others are masquerading as a resistance force, abducting and training the children into a fighting force, which they will deploy as the Fifth Wave to end humanity. Ben and Ringer decide to bolt with the rest of Squad 53, but Ben insists on going back for Sammy, who was left on base due to his age.

Ben and Cassie both enter the base. They eventually run into each other and join each other. They find Sammy, but are taunted and thwarted by the acting commander of the base, Colonel Alexander Vosch. Evan saves them and says his goodbyes to Cassie before he detonates bombs that level the base, though he is lost in the process. Cassie, Ben, and Sammy ride off with Squad 53 as Wright-Patterson is destroyed.

The book was adapted into a film by J Blakeson and Columbia Pictures, under the title The 5th Wave, and was released on January 22, 2016. The film was mildly successful, though news is still pending regarding the production of a sequel.

The Infinite Sea

The Infinite Sea is the second installment in the series, released on September 16, 2014.

The book becomes much more involved with the members of Squad 53 and the character Ringer. The group takes refuge in an old hotel near the ruins of Wright-Patterson, at Cassie's insistence that Evan is still alive. Ringer sets out to find an alternate route, though it goes awry when she mistakes Teacup, a small girl of the squad, for a Silencer, shoots her, and is taken by an approaching helicopter. Evan is revealed to have survived, having been rescued by another Silencer named Grace. Evan attempts to kill Grace after he finds out she is hunting Cassie, and though he fails, he manages to flee during an attack by hidden assailants. Evan finds the hotel Cassie is stationed at, though he is shot and knocked out in a misunderstanding with Squad 53. Cassie tends to him, while Ben angrily awaits his awakening. Later, a helicopter quickly flies over the hotel, and then a small girl, whom Sammy identifies as one Megan, appears. Evan wakes up and warns them that she is rigged with a bomb that explodes when it comes into contact with human breath. Evan and Cassie extract the bomb from Megan's throat. Grace appears and, after a violent confrontation, is killed when Private Poundcake detonates the bomb near her, also killing himself and destroying the hotel.

The second part of the story follows Private Ringer. She is taken to a base somewhere, similar to Wright-Patterson, and meets the alive-and-well Colonel Vosch. Vosch constantly thwarts her with mind games and preaches to her a philosophy that "rage is not the answer". She semi-befriends a recruit called Razor, who is aware that Vosch and the staff of the base are indeed the Others. Vosch installs Ringer with a piece of technology, the "twelfth system", that enhances her strength. He also reveals to Ringer that Silencers were never actually Others, just humans planted with fake memories and enhanced by the twelfth system with a link to the alien Mothership. It is concluded that there are only dozens of true Others in the world, and that the Mothership is the last remnant of their society programmed with the goal of eradicating humans. Ringer and Razor attempt to escape, though Razor secretly conspired with Vosch, and they were being monitored the entire time. Ringer learns, neutralizes Razor, and runs off, but not fast enough to evade Vosch, who incapacitates her. Razor is ordered to rejuvenate Ringer, though he does more and the two sleep together in a rough, hazy love. When they arrive back on base, Razor kills Teacup, whom Vosch used as a bargaining chip, in order to set Ringer free. Razor is shot dead, and Ringer escapes the base.

As the novel closes, Cassie and Squad 53 recover from the bomb that destroyed the hotel, when Evan, weak and exhausted, emerges from the woods.

The book was noted for its dark appeal, and was released to the same good reception as its predecessor.

The Last Star

The Last Star, the third and final book in The 5th Wave series, was released on May 24, 2016.

The Fifth Wave is still commencing, or so the characters believe. Ringer and Evan know that once Vosch and the other few Others are withdrawn from the surface, the Mothership will drop massive bombs on the surface to obliterate any trace of humanity left on Earth. Cassie and Squad 53 settle in the dead Silencer Grace's former home. Ringer returns to Vosch knowing that he will kill Ben Parish and the rest of Squad 53 if she does not kill the persistently rebellious Evan Walker for him. She takes a helicopter to the town that the squad stationed themselves in and is attacked by a Silencer. She is met by Ben after the Silencer is killed, and the two head to the house. Ringer immediately attempts to kill Evan, but they are interrupted by an incoming helicopter. Evan realizes why Ringer intended to kill him and he submits and is taken.

The group devises a plan to not only save Evan but to end the Others permanently. Cassie and Ringer infiltrate the base via a hijacked helicopter. Ringer detonates several bombs to incite chaos on the base, and, after many complications, they reach the command center of the base. Ben, having stayed behind to protect Sam and Megan, is attacked by a patrol and the three are taken back to the base. Cassie and Ringer attempt to find Evan's data on the CPU to locate him, though they do not know how to sift through each cell individually, and so Cassie downloads the data of every logged person to her own head to find it. She learns everything there is to know about anything who was ever downloaded in the CPU, and she learns the codes and layout of the base. Evan arrives, now completely devoid of humanity at the hands of the twelfth system. He fights Ringer and disables her easily. However, he walks into a trap when Cassie drops a live electric cable on the wet surface beneath him (as a result of the sprinkler system). Ringer wakes up to see Vosch, who has become attached to her and wishes to bring her with him in his extraction pod. The conversation is only a decoy from Ringer, allowing Cassie to shoot and kill him from behind. Cassie then uses the knowledge she gained to open Vosch's escape pod and she ascends into the sky. Ringer gets ahold of a device from Vosch that will electrocute any soldier with a tracking implant in them. Without much else of a choice, she activates it. Ben, Sam, and Megan dive out of their helicopter as the soldiers and pilot die, and they realize Cassie and Ringer must still be alive.

Cassie, now ascending to the Mothership, has a chance to glimpse the memories that she now has from tens of thousands of people. She begins to truly think about what humanity is worth, when the pod nears the Mothership. She takes out an explosive pill from her pocket that Vosch originally gave to Ringer so she could kill herself rather than be destroyed in the bombs of the Fifth Wave. She bites down on the pill, and the Mothership explodes. Ben and the kids witness this to their sorrow and delight. They enter the base and find Ringer paralyzed on the floor.

Some time later, the group has settled down in a house in Marble Falls, with Ben and Ringer raising Sam and Megan like their own children, and Evan (the twelfth system having kept him alive and the group having restored his memories and humanity with the CPU) watches over them. Seeing no future for himself there, he sets off away from the four, on a mission to kill every single Silencer and Fifth Waver there is left in the world.

Characters

Main Characters 

Cassiopeia "Cassie" Marie Sullivan - the main protagonist of the series. Her namesake is the constellation Cassiopeia. Both of her parents died in the first four waves. Her younger brother Sammy is taken by The Others to a "training camp" called Camp Haven, formerly, Wright-Patterson AFB. She is seventeen years old and is described as a short, strawberry-blonde girl with average features.

Evan Walker - a farm boy from rural Ohio. All of his family and girlfriend were killed in the Third Wave by the Red Death. Earlier in his life at a carnival, he meets Grace, who is the only person he finds to be like him, an Other. He saves Cassie after she is shot by an Other sniper, the "Silencer". Cassie soon finds out that Evan is actually an Other and not truly human. He is described as being a tall boy, at least eighteen or nineteen years old, being very muscular with chocolate-brown hair. Cassie also notes his soft hands. He develops strong feelings for Cassie, and so does she. Though, these feelings are strained when Cassie learns that Evan is an Other. Evan is rescued by Grace, who tries to seduce him, but, after they are attacked and Grace is wounded, he makes his way to Cassie. Grace, however, follows him there. A confrontation ensues, after which Poundcake blows up the hotel after Evan was left behind in the hotel, and it is not clear if Evan survives. However, at the end of The Infinite Sea, he emerges from the woods to find Cassie.

Benjamin "Ben" Thomas Parish or "Zombie" - the varsity quarterback of the football team at Cassie's school. Cassie secretly was in love with him. His family was killed during the first four waves by a group of psychotic looters. He is crushed by the fact that he ran while his baby sister was killed. He keeps a locket with a photo of her. He becomes a member of Camp Haven's makeshift army, not knowing that they are The Others (though he eventually finds out), taking the nickname "Zombie". After one of his squadmates goes crazy, or "Dorothy", Private Ringer replaces him. He obsesses with getting her to smile. Cassie describes him as overall gorgeous.

Marika "Ringer" - a member of Squad 53. Her father was an Atheist and a chess player. He taught her how to play. Marika's father was usually drunk. Her father is infected with the Red Death and dies of the disease. Marika wandered through the wilderness before forcefully being recruited into Camp Haven's army, where she took the nickname "Ringer". She is a replacement after Private Tank of Squad 53 went crazy, "Dorothy", and pulled a gun on his squad. Zombie is obsessed with getting Ringer to smile. On their first patrol, she and Zombie find that Camp Haven's officials are actually The Others. She is described as having glossy black hair and mild Asian features. In The Infinite Sea, she grows closer to Private Teacup, and, after being captured, grows feelings for a recruit named Razor.

Sammy "Nugget" Sullivan - Cassie's five-year-old little brother. At his refugee camp, he boards a bus from Camp Haven and is recruited into its army, unbeknownst to his father's death. He joins Squad 53 and friends Zombie deeply. Sammy is not allowed to go on his squad's patrol due to his age. (We later find out the purpose of kids his age at Camp Haven in The Infinite Sea.) Zombie, Cassie, and Evan unite after Commander Vosch attempts to kill Sammy. Evan destroys the base, though it is not clear whether he survives or not, and Cassie, Sam and Ben escape.

Secondary Characters 

Lieutenant Colonel Alexander Vosch - the leading officer at Camp Haven. He is sadistic and cruel. He survives the destruction of Camp Haven and "enhances" Ringer with the twelfth system, a piece of Other technology designed to enhance the human anatomy in ways such as strength, agility, and speed. Vosch also tries to kill Sammy via electrocution while having Zombie and Cassie watch, though Evan managed to cut the power at Camp Haven just in time. Vosch also personally killed Cassie's father at her refugee camp.

Grace - a Silencer like Evan. They befriended each other before the waves began. Grace saves Evan after he destroys Camp Haven. One night after one of her hunts, she tries to seduce Evan, but he attacks her and renders her unconscious. Believing her to be dead, Evan heads back to the hotel Cassie's group has taken refuge in. Grace follows him to Cassie's group where she then attacks them. After this violent confrontation, Private Poundcake, now mortally wounded, goes back to the hotel to retrieve the bomb dropped by Sammy and detonates it an arms-length away from Grace, killing both of them.

Dumbo - the medical officer in Squad 53. One of his most prominent features is his extraordinarily large ears, like his namesake.

Allison "Teacup" or "Cup" - a seven-year-old member of Squad 53. She is described as "the meanest seven-year-old you've ever seen" by Zombie. Teacup grows close to Ringer after the destruction of Camp Haven. She is shot by Ringer who mistakes her for an Other. Teacup is captured alongside Ringer and Vosch uses Teacup as leverage against Ringer. Teacup is killed by Razor so Vosch will have no more leverage against her.

Poundcake - a chubby member of Squad 53 who is mostly silent. His mother was killed by the Red Death. While he was on a supply run, he returned to find his brother gone. On the supply run, he found only a sweet treat, his namesake, as his drill sergeant thought he was "so sweet". He sacrificed himself to save the others of his group by detonating a bomb rigged to detonate on high concentrations of carbon dioxide in close proximity to Grace, a Silencer targeting the group.

Megan - a seven-year-old girl rescued and taken to Camp Haven. She meets and befriends Sammy on the bus they ride. Megan is, along with many other kids her age that are part of the Fifth Wave, rigged with a carbon dioxide-bomb. She is dropped off near Cassie's group's hideout. Evan and Cassie manage to get the bomb out of her, for which they plan to use to attack the others, though Poundcake ends up detonating it to save the others from Grace.

Flintstone "Flint" - a boy around Ben and Cassie's age. He is the former leader of Squad 53, until his drill sergeant, Reznik, replaced him with Zombie. He accidentally kills himself after he messes with the piece of equipment Zombie and Ringer found on Reznik. He was a skeptic of the conspiracy they told of.

Tank - a young boy in Squad 53. He goes "Dorothy" (crazy) and is replaced by Ringer. Zombie and Dumbo discover him dead in the P&D Hangar (Processing and Disposal).

Kenny "Oompa" - an eight-or-nine-year-old boy on Squad 53. He is killed by grenade shrapnel on the squad's first patrol.

Razor - a recruit at the base where Ringer was captured. He helped her escape, though Ringer finds out he was secretly working with Vosch. After a fight with Vosch injuring Ringer, Razor is assigned to watch her in a hospital littered with dead bodies. Razor clears these out. He and Ringer attempt to reconcile and do so easily. They in turn sleep together. When they return to the base, he shoots Teacup so that Vosch will have no leverage over Ringer. He in turn is shot and killed himself.

Film adaptation 

In March 2012, Columbia Pictures picked up the film rights to the trilogy, with Graham King and Tobey Maguire attached as producers. A film adaptation of the first novel in the series was released on January 22, 2016. It was directed by J Blakeson, with a screenplay by Susannah Grant, Akiva Goldsman, and Jeff Pinkner. While the film was a moderate box office success, it was derided by critics and audiences, and prospects of adapting the rest of the series remain low.

References 

Book series introduced in 2013
American science fiction novels
American young adult novels
Alien invasions in novels
Young adult novel series
The 5th Wave
American post-apocalyptic novels